1842 Hynek, provisional designation , is a stony Florian asteroid from the inner regions of the asteroid belt, approximately 8 kilometers in diameter.

The asteroid was discovered on 14 January 1972 by Czech astronomer Luboš Kohoutek at Hamburg Observatory, who named it after his father, Hynek Kohoutek.

Orbit and classification 

Hynek is member of the Flora family. It orbits the Sun in the inner main-belt at a distance of 1.9–2.7 AU once every 3 years and 5 months (1,246 days). Its orbit has an eccentricity of 0.18 and an inclination of 5° with respect to the ecliptic.

Physical characteristics 

In the Tholen classification, Hynek is characterized as a common S-type asteroid.

Rotation period 

In July 2007, the so-far best rated rotational lightcurve of Hynek was obtained from photometric observations by French amateur astronomer Pierre Antonini. Lightcurve analysis gave a well-defined rotation period of 3.9410 hours with a brightness variation of 0.17 magnitude.

Diameter and albedo 

According to the surveys carried out by NASA's Wide-field Infrared Survey Explorer with its subsequent NEOWISE mission, Hynek measures between 7.996 and 9.31 kilometers in diameter, and its surface has an albedo between 0.28 of 0.300.

The Collaborative Asteroid Lightcurve Link assumes a standard albedo for stony asteroids of 0.20 and calculates a diameter of 9.80 kilometers with an absolute magnitude of 12.41.

Naming 

This minor planet was named after Hynek Kohoutek, the father of the discoverer, celebrating his 70th birthday. The official  was published by the Minor Planet Center on 20 December 1974.

References

External links 
 Asteroid Lightcurve Database (LCDB), query form (info )
 Dictionary of Minor Planet Names, Google books
 Asteroids and comets rotation curves, CdR – Observatoire de Geneve, Raoul Behrend
 
 

001842
Discoveries by Luboš Kohoutek
Named minor planets
001842
19720114